Futsal has become very popular in Fiji since the mid-1990s. It is a game similar to football, played on a smaller pitch; often indoors. Regular tournaments are frequently held by local organizers. Players form teams and play in pool matches leading to semis and finals. Currently Futsal pitches in Fiji are mostly located in the Capital City Suva. The major pitches are the Vodafone Arena and the Tattersells Leisure Centre.

Futsal is generally played in a rectangular field (approx. 38m * 18m). There are two teams, each with a maximum of 5 members. A match has a referee who enforces the laws of the game. A typical match lasts about 20 minutes. The game is played by each team scoring a goal. A goal is scored when the ball passed over the goal line between the goalposts and under the crossbar. Team that scores the maximum goals in the specified time wins the match.

References

Differences Between Futsal and Soccer

 
Sport in Fiji